Lauren Louise McQueen (born 12 July 1996) is an English actress. She gained prominence through her role as Lily Drinkwell on the Channel 4 soap opera, Hollyoaks. She also appeared on the CBBC school-drama 4 O'Clock Club as Rachel and on Ordinary Lies as Amelie.

Early life and education
McQueen is from Fazakerley, a suburb in north Liverpool. She attended St John Bosco Arts College in Croxteth and took classes with Allstars Casting.

Career
McQueen’s first credited acting role was as Yasmin Goody on the BBC One miniseries Good Cop. She then appeared as Alison on the Christmas-comedy drama Little Crackers.

In 2013, McQueen appeared as Rachel on CBBC musical-comedy show 4 O'Clock Club for four episodes as a love interest to the main character, Josh. Shortly after she made appearances as Molly on Channel 4's The Mill, Amelie on Ordinary Lies and Shelly on The Violators. In 2016, McQueen played Catherine Howard, the fifth wife of Henry VIII of England (Richard Ridgins) in an episode of the series Six Wives with Lucy Worsley. She later played the lead role of Sophie in the British-Canadian film-drama The Wasting.

On 22 December 2016, it was announced that McQueen had been cast as Lily Drinkwell, the niece of Hollyoaks character Diane O'Connor, played by Alex Fletcher. McQueen's character Lily, made her on-screen appearance on Hollyoaks on 6 January 2017. Since joining Hollyoaks, McQueen's character has been involved in a relationship with Prince McQueen (Malique Thompson-Dwyer) and a self-harming storyline, in which McQueen worked with the charities Samaritan and Mind for an accurate portrayal. The storyline won "Best Storyline" and "Best Single Episode" in the British Soap Awards 2018. 

McQueen will appear in the upcoming drama miniseries, Masters of the Air, developed by Steven Spielberg and Tom Hanks, which serves as the next in the chronology after Band of Brothers and The Pacific.

Personal life 
She is a Liverpool FC fan.

Filmography

Film

Television

Awards

References

External links 

Living people
1996 births
English people of Irish descent
Actresses from Liverpool
English soap opera actresses
People from Fazakerley